Hassan Wali also known as Dhupai (Punjabi: حسن والی, romanized: hassān-wálī or dhūpâi), officially the Dhupai Hassan Wali (Punjabi: ڈُھْپَئِ حَسَنْ وَاْلِیْ, romanized: dhūpâi hassān wálī). Hassan Wali or Dhupai s a small village located in Wazirabad Tehsil, Gujranwala District, Punjab, Pakistan.

Demography 
Hassan Wali has a population of over 2,700 and is located about 40 kilometres northwest of Gujranwala city. Most people in the village speak Punjabi, though almost all of them can also speak the national language of Pakistan, Urdu. English is spoken by the educated elite in Hassan Wali. The majority of the native people are from Toor caste and are rooted here for around five hundred years or more.

Education 
For education in the village, a Government Schools are functional by the Government of Punjab, Pakistan under the Board of Intermediate and Secondary Education, Gujranwala.

 Government Girls Primary School (GGPS), Hassan Wali
 Government Boys Primary School (GPS), Hassan Wali

Communication 
The only way to get Hassan Wali is by road. Besides driving your own car (which takes about 5 minutes from Kalaske Cheema). Wazirabad-Faisalabad rail link is the only nearby railway line.

See also 

 Iftikhar Nagar Cheema
 Kale Wala
 Gill Wala

References 

Villages in Gujranwala District